Goyri is a Basque surname. Notable people with the surname include: 

María Goyri (1873–1955), Spanish academic and advocate
Roberto González Goyri (1924–2007), Guatemalan painter, sculptor, and muralist
Sergio Goyri (born 1958), Mexican actor

Basque-language surnames